Antipterna is a genus of moths of the family Oecophoridae, first described by Edward Meyrick in 1916.

Species
(From IRMNG):
Antipterna acrobaphes 
Antipterna assulosa 
Antipterna diclethra 
Antipterna diplosticta 
Antipterna euanthes 
Antipterna glacialis 
Antipterna hemimelas 
Antipterna homoleuca 
Antipterna homopasta 
Antipterna lithophanes 
Antipterna microphanes 
Antipterna monostropha 
Antipterna naias 
Antipterna nivea 
Antipterna panarga 
Antipterna ptychomochla 
Antipterna spathulata 
Antipterna stichoptis 
Antipterna tephrodes 
Antipterna trilicella

References

External links 

 Images & occurrence data from GBIF.
 Antipterna

Taxa described in 1916
Taxa named by Edward Meyrick